Libňatov is a municipality and village in Trutnov District in the Hradec Králové Region of the Czech Republic. It has about 400 inhabitants.

History
The first written mention of Libňatov is from 1461.

References

Villages in Trutnov District